Kálmán Kovács may refer to:

 Kálmán Kovács (footballer, born 1965), Hungarian football player
 Kálmán Kovács (footballer, born 1911) (1911–?), Hungarian football player
 Kálmán Kovács (canoeist), Hungarian sprint canoer